Ludwigsstadt is a town in the district of Kronach, in the Upper Franconian region of Bavaria, Germany.

Geography
It is situated in the valley of the Loquitz River, a tributary of the Saale, in the Thuringian-Franconian Highlands of the Thuringian Slate Mountains and the Franconian Forest mountain ranges. Ludwigsstadt is the only municipality of the State of Bavaria located north of the Rennsteig ridge.

History

The settlement in the Landgraviate of Thuringia was first mentioned in a 1269 deed as Ludwichsdorf, probably named after a local Vogt official of the Counts of Weimar-Orlamünde. In 1427 the area around historic Lauenstein Castle was acquired by the Hohenzollern Elector Frederick I of Brandenburg, who added it as a northern exclave to his Franconian Principality of Kulmbach. Ludwigsstadt received town privileges in 1490, which it again lost in 1525, as the citizens joined a rebellion against the landlords during the German Peasants' War.

In 1622 Margrave Christian of Brandenburg-Bayreuth, colonel of the Imperial Franconian Circle, finally purchased Ludwigsstadt. When his descendant Margrave Charles Alexander resigned in 1791, he sold his possessions to his Hohenzollern relatives in the Kingdom of Prussia. In the course of the German Mediatisation in 1803, Ludwigsstadt fell to the Electorate of Bavaria.

Transport
In 1885 Ludwigsstadt achieved access to the Franconian Forest Railway line, connecting the Bavarian Ludwig South-North Railway near Lichtenfels with the Thuringian Saal Railway at Saalfeld. It soon evolved to one of the most important north–south railway connections in Germany, linking the Prussian capital Berlin with Nuremberg and Munich.

Between 1945 and 1990 Ludwigsstadt station served as West German checkpoint for crossing the inner German border by rail with its counterpart at Probstzella station. The border crossing was open for trains travelling from West to East Germany or West Berlin. The traffic was subject to the interzonal traffic regulations, that regarding trains between West Germany and West Berlin followed the special regulations of the Transit Agreement (1972).

After German Reunification, the railway was restored and since 2000 is part of the Intercity Express (ICE) network with hourly trains linking Berlin and Munich. As the winding line however does not allow fast travelling, it is to be replaced by the Nuremberg–Erfurt high-speed railway.

References

Kronach (district)
Inner German border